Gabel or Gäbel is a German surname. Notable people with the surname include:

 Andrew Gabel (born 1964), American speed skater
 Birgitte Sofie Gabel (1746–1769), Danish noblewoman
 Christoffer Gabel (1617–1673), Danish statesman
 Claudia Gabel (born 1975), American author
 Elyes Gabel (born 1983), English actor
 Frederik Gabel (1645–1708), Danish-Norwegian nobleman
 Jens Gäbel (born 1968), German curler
 Joseph Gabel (1912–2004), French sociologist
 Keith Gabel (born 1984), American snowboarder
 Kristoffer Gabel (1617–1673), Danish statesman
 Loren Gabel (born 1997), Canadian ice hockey player
 Martin Gabel (1912–1986), American actor, director, and producer
 Peter Gabel (born 1947), American law academic
 Robyn Gabel (born 1953), American politician 
 Seth Gabel (born 1981), American actor 
 Shainee Gabel, film director, A Love Song for Bobby Long
 Thuraya Qabil (born 1943), Saudi Arabian poet and journalist whose surname is sometimes spelt 'Gabel'.

German-language surnames